Jorma Gallen-Kallela (né Gallén) (22 November 1898, in Ruovesi – 1 December 1939) was a Finnish artist. He followed in the footsteps of his father, the famed artist Akseli Gallen-Kallela.

Biography

He studied arts in Buenos Aires in 1915–17, Copenhagen in 1918–19, under Maurice Denis in Paris in 1919–21 and lastly in Vienna in 1929.

He fought in the Finnish Civil War on the side of the White Guard.

He worked with his father on the Kalevala cupola frescoes at the lobby of the National Museum of Finland in 1928. In 1931, after his father had died and a fire destroyed his father's frescoes in the Jusélius Mausoleum, he used his father's sketches as basis to repaint the frescoes.

His independent works were the artworks for the Kalevala and Rintamamies postage stamps.

He fought in the Winter War, having risen to the rank of lieutenant. While he was inspecting a downed plane of the Soviet Air Force with captain Adolf Ehrnrooth on either the first or the second day of the war, he and Ehrnrooth were ambushed. He saved Ehrnrooth by throwing himself over him, but he himself died from his wounds.

Gallery

References

External links

1898 births
1939 deaths
People from Ruovesi
People of the Finnish Civil War (White side)
Finnish military personnel killed in World War II
20th-century Finnish painters